No Choe was a son of No In who was one of the four members (No In, Han Eum, Sam and Wang Gyeop) who operated the government of Wiman Joseon.

Biography
Since his father No In had a family name, it Is believed that he was an exile from China or person related to China. Just like his master Ugeo who was the last king of Wiman Joseon. In BC 109 to 108, when Han dynasty attacked Wiman Joseon, his father was surrendered instantly together with Han Eum and Wang Gyeop while leaving the King of Wiman Joseon Ugeo. Next year, Sam who resisted Han dynasty sent an assassin and killed Ugeo. After Uego’s death, some ministers still resisted to Han dynasty, but Han dynasty sent Wi Jang, who was a son of Ugeo and No Choe to kill those ministries. And made them surrendered to Han dynasty. No Choe himself was given preferential treatment by Han dynasty because his father No In had died when he was on the way to surrender. He was nominated as a peerage of Nieyang (Hanja:涅陽) but Nieyang was abolished in 5 years because there was no successor.

Family
Father: No In

See also
Han conquest of Gojoseon

References

Source

註 042

Wiman Joseon people
Korean people of Chinese descent
Korean politicians
2nd-century BC Chinese people
2nd-century BC Korean people